Natalia Biletskaya (Ukrainian: Наталія Білецька, born 06 November 1972) is a former female tennis player from Ukraine.

Playing for Ukraine at the Fed Cup has a win–loss record of 2–5.

ITF Circuit finals

Singles: 4 (2 titles, 2 runner-ups)

Doubles: 8 (3 titles, 5 runner-ups)

References

External links
 
 

Ukrainian female tennis players
1972 births
Living people
Soviet female tennis players
20th-century Ukrainian women